The Bras de Bronne (sometimes spelled Bras de Brosne) is a small river in northern France whose  course crosses the departement of the Pas-de-Calais.
Its source is at the hamlet of Etreuille, near the village of  Saint-Michel-sous-Bois. It flows through the communes of Humbert, Sempy, Aix-en-Issart, Marant, Marenla and joins the river Canche at Marles-sur-Canche.
In winter, it is fed by an even smaller river at the commune of Quilen.
There's an ancient watermill at Sempy.

References

Rivers of France
Rivers of Hauts-de-France
Rivers of the Pas-de-Calais